Darwin Lynn "Go Go" Gonnerman (January 3, 1947 – February 7, 2015) was a Canadian football player who played for the Winnipeg Blue Bombers, Ottawa Rough Riders and Edmonton Eskimos. He won the Grey Cup in 1969 with Ottawa. He previously played college football at South Dakota State University. He died after a brief hospitalization in 2015.

References

1947 births
2015 deaths
Winnipeg Blue Bombers players
Ottawa Rough Riders players
Edmonton Elks players
People from Rock County, Minnesota
Canadian football running backs
American football running backs
South Dakota State Jackrabbits football players
Players of American football from Minnesota
American players of Canadian football